Psallus variabilis is a species of plant bug in the family Miridae. It is found in the Palearctic and as an adventive species in North America.
It feeds on the sap of a variety of forest trees including Quercus, plum and crab apple trees and on rose, raspberry and cranberry.

References

Further reading

External links
Miridae dk

External links

 

Phylini
Articles created by Qbugbot
Insects described in 1807
Taxa named by Carl Fredrik Fallén